Events from the year 1415 in Ireland.

Incumbent
Lord: Henry V

Deaths
 Art mac Art MacMurrough-Kavanagh, King of Leinster.
 An Clasach Ó Cobhthaigh, an Irish poet.

References

 
1410s in Ireland
Ireland
Years of the 15th century in Ireland